Mrozek, Mrożek, and Mrózek are Polish surnames. Notable people with this surname include:

 Irmina Mrózek Gliszczyńska (born 1992), Polish sailor
 Jacques Mrozek (born 1950), French figure skater
 Marcin Mrożek (born 1990), Polish cyclist
 Sławomir Mrożek (1930–2013), Polish dramatist

See also
 

Polish-language surnames